Anthony Lewis (1927–2013) was an American intellectual and columnist for The New York Times.

Anthony Lewis may also refer to:
Anthony Lewis (musician) (1915–1983), English conductor, composer, editor, and academic
Anthony Lewis (English cricketer) (born 1932), English former cricketer
Anthony Lewis (Trinidadian cricketer) (born 1949), Trinidadian cricketer
Tony Lewis (born 1938), Welsh cricketer and cricket commentator
Tony Lewis (mathematician) (1942–2020), British cricket statistician
Tony Lewis (musician) (1957–2020), English singer-songwriter and former vocalist and bassist for the Outfield
Anthony Lewis (illustrator) (born 1966), British children's illustrator
Anthony Lewis (baseball) (born 1971), American baseball player
Anthony Lewis (actor) (born 1983), British actor
M. Anthony Lewis, American robotics researcher
Tony Lewis (The 10th Kingdom), a character from The 10th Kingdom